The Ex-Students' Association of The University of Texas (more commonly known as Texas Exes) is the association of former students of the University of Texas at Austin.

The organization is one of the largest alumni associations in the world (the Texas Exes Houston Chapter has over 10,000 members), with chapters in 69 Texas cities, most U.S. states and the District of Columbia, and several foreign countries.  The Texas Exes publish a magazine called The Alcalde.

The alumni association is headquartered in the Alumni Center, adjacent to Darrell K Royal–Texas Memorial Stadium on the University campus. The alumni center hosts gatherings coinciding with home football games and also organizes traveling groups for away events.

The Texas Exes are actively involved in funding scholarships for students at the University.

See also
List of University of Texas at Austin people

References

External links

 
Alumni associations of academic institutions
Organizations established in 1885
1885 establishments in Texas